John Rudd may refer to:

John Rudd (basketball), NBA player
John Rudd (cartographer), Tudor map maker
John Rudd (navy), captain of the 
John Rudd (rugby player), rugby union player

See also
Jonathan Rudd (disambiguation)